Fichtenberg may refer to the following places in Germany:

 Fichtenberg (Württemberg), in the Schwäbisch Hall district 
 A part of Mühlberg (Elbe) in the Elbe-Elster district 
 Fichtenberg (Berlin), a part of the Steglitz district in Berlin